Modesto Llosas Rosell (24 November 1920 – 20 April 1972) known professionally as Jorge Mistral was a Spanish film actor. During the 1940s, he became a star in films produced by CIFESA. In the 1950s, he lived and worked in México and appeared in Luis Buñuel's Abismos de pasión in 1954. Later, in the 1960s, he directed three films.

Early life
Jorge Mistral was born Modesto Llosas Rosell on 24 November 1920 in Aldaia, a city located next to Valencia, Spain. His father was from Puerto Rico and his mother from Catalonia.

Death
Suffering from cancer, Mistral committed suicide with a gunshot while living in Mexico City, Mexico.

Filmography
 La Llamada del mar (1944)
 Ángela es así (1945)
 White Mission (1946)
 El Emigrado (1946)
 The Gypsy and the King (1946)
 Mar abierto (1946)
 Las Inquietudes de Shanti Andía (1947)
 Héroes del 95 (1947)
 La Nao capitana (1947)
 Lady in Ermine (1947)
 Pototo, Boliche y Compañía (1948)
 Madness for Love (1948)
 Botón de ancla (1948)
 Neutrality (1949)
 Currito of the Cross (1949)
 Sabela de Cambados (1949)
 La Manigua sin dios (1949)
 The Duchess of Benameji (1949)
 Pequeñeces (1950)
 Pobre corazón (1950)
 Burlada (1951)
 Desired (1951)
 Monte de piedad (1951)
 Peregrina (1951)
 La trinca del aire (1951)
 Amar fué su pecado (1951)
 El Mar y tú (1952)
 La Noche es nuestra (1952)
 Tres hombres en mi vida (1952)
 Derecho de nacer, El (1952)
 Mujer que tu quieres, La (1952)
 Sister San Sulpicio (1952)
 Mentira, La (1952)
 Apasionada (1952)
 The Count of Monte Cristo (1953)
 Quiero vivir (1953)
 Orquídeas para mi esposa (1954)
 Camelia (1954)
 Tres citas con el destino (1954)
 Abismos de pasión (1954)
 An Andalusian Gentleman (1954)
 Más fuerte que el amor (1955)
 Tren expreso, El (1955)
 Caso de la mujer asesinadita, El (1955)
 Para siempre (1955)
 Amor en cuatro tiempos (1955)
 The Big Lie (1956)
 The Cat (1956)
 The Legion of Silence (1956)
 Andalusia Express (1956)
 Schiave di Cartagine, Le (1957)
 Boy on a Dolphin (1957)
 Cabo de hornos (1957)
 The Sword and the Cross (1958)
 Racconti d'estate (1958)
 Amor prohibido (1958)
 Amore a prima vista (1958)
 La venganza (1958)
 Carmen la de Ronda (1959)
 Creo en ti (1960)
 The White Sister (1960)
 È arrivata la parigina (1960)
 Ventolera (1961)
 Tres Romeos y una Julieta (1961)
 Juana Gallo (1961)
 Chamaca, La (1961)
 Amor de los amores, El (1962)
 Bajo un mismo rostro (1962)
 Pecado (1962)
 Historia de una noche (1963)
 Shéhérazade (1963)
 Gunfighters of Casa Grande (1964)
 Fiebre del deseo, La (1966)
 Piel desnuda, La (1966)
 Crimen sin olvido (1968)
 Debutantes en el amor, Los (1969)
 Corrompidos, Los (1971)
 Ardiente deseo, El (1971)
 Puertas del paraíso, Las (1971)
 Justicia tiene doce años, La (1973)
 Invasión de los muertos, La (1973)
 Diamantes, oro, y amor (1973)

Filmography as film director
 Crimen sin olvido (1968) (Inédita)
 La Piel desnuda (1966)
 La Fiebre del deseo (1966)

Screenwriter
Crimen sin olvido (1968)
La Piel desnuda (1966)

References

External links
 
 

1920 births
1972 suicides
People from Horta Oest
Actors from the Valencian Community
Spanish male film actors
Spanish film directors
Spanish emigrants to Mexico
Spanish people of Puerto Rican descent
Film directors from the Valencian Community
Suicides by firearm in Mexico
20th-century Mexican male actors
20th-century Spanish male actors
Mexican male film actors
1972 deaths